The Secret of Stamboul, also known as The Spy in White, is a 1936 British thriller film, taken from the 1935 novel The Eunuch of Stamboul by Dennis Wheatley, directed by Andrew Marton and starring Valerie Hobson, James Mason and Frank Vosper. It was made at Shepperton Studios. The screenplay concerns a British agent who tries to thwart a revolution.

Premise
A British agent (Mason) travels to Istanbul (Stamboul) to try to thwart a revolution.

Cast
 Valerie Hobson as Tania
 Frank Vosper as Kazdim
 James Mason as Larry
 Kay Walsh as Diana
 Peter Haddon as Peter
 Laura Cowie as Baroness
 Cecil Ramage as Prince Ali
 Robert English as Sir George  
 Emilio Cargher as Renouf  
 Leonard Sachs as Arif  
 Andreas Malandrinos as Moltov

References

Bibliography
 Low, Rachael. Filmmaking in 1930s Britain. George Allen & Unwin, 1985.
 Wood, Linda. British Films, 1927-1939. British Film Institute, 1986.

External links

1936 films
1930s adventure thriller films
British adventure thriller films
1930s English-language films
Films directed by Andrew Marton
Films set in Istanbul
Films set in England
Films based on British novels
Films based on works by Dennis Wheatley
Films shot at Shepperton Studios
Films with screenplays by Noel Langley
British black-and-white films
1930s British films